Leontopodium microphyllum, known as Taiwan edelweiss, or small leaf edelweiss, is a species of plant in the family Asteraceae. It is endemic to the mountains of Taiwan.

The plant is a relative of the European Edelweiss (Leontopodium alpinum). It was first published by Japanese botanist Bunzō Hayata in 1908.

Description

References

microphyllum
Endemic flora of Taiwan
Alpine flora
Plants described in 1908